(15788) 1993 SB is a trans-Neptunian object of the plutino class. Apart from Pluto, it was one of the first such objects discovered (beaten by two days by (385185) 1993 RO and by one day by 1993 RP), and the first to have an orbit calculated well enough to receive a number. The discovery was made in 1993 at the La Palma Observatory with the Isaac Newton Telescope.
Very little is known about the object. Even the diameter estimate of ~130 km is based on an assumed albedo of 0.09.

KBO's found in 1993 include: (15788) 1993 SB, (15789) 1993 SC, (181708) 1993 FW, and (385185) 1993 RO.

Over one thousand bodies were found in a belt between orbiting between about 30-50 AU from the Sun in the twenty years (1992-2012), after finding 1992 QB1 (named in 2018, 15760 Albion), showing a vast belt of bodies more than just Pluto and Albion.  By 2018, over 2000 Kuiper belts objects were discovered.

References

External links 
 MPEC: recovery of the object
 list of known TNOs, including size estimates
 IAU minor planet lists
 

Plutinos
1993 SB
1993 SB
1993 SB
19930916